Clayton J. Whisnant is Chapman Professor of the Humanities and European History at Wofford College.

Works

References

Historians of sexuality
Living people
Historians of Germany
Wofford College faculty
Year of birth missing (living people)